Dorin Popovici (born 1 July 1996) is a Moldovan footballer who currently plays as a midfielder for CF Ungheni.

Career 
In March 2016 left FC Milsami Orhei and signed with League rival FC Petrocub Hîncești. He played 10 League matches in the second half of the 2015–16 season for FC Petrocub Hîncești and signed in July 2016 with English non-League club Billericay Town.

References

External links 
 

1996 births
Living people
Moldovan footballers
Expatriate footballers in England
Billericay Town F.C. players
Moldovan expatriate sportspeople in England
Moldovan expatriate footballers
Isthmian League players
Association football midfielders
FC Milsami Orhei players
CS Petrocub Hîncești players
FC Ungheni players
Moldovan Super Liga players